OSF Little Company of Mary Medical Center is a hospital in Evergreen Park, Illinois, USA. The hospital was founded on January 19, 1930, by the Sisters of the Little Company of Mary and serves much of the southwest side of Chicago. On October 17, 2019, OSF HealthCare signed a merger agreement with Little Company of Mary Hospital. The merger took place on February 1, 2020.

The first kidney transplant was performed in Little Company of Mary Hospital in 1950 on a 44-year-old woman who had polycystic kidney disease.

Deaths
Mahalia Jackson (1911–1972).

References

External links
Little Company of Mary Hospital Official Website

Hospital buildings completed in 1930
Hospitals in Illinois
Evergreen Park, Illinois
Hospitals in Cook County, Illinois